Jerome Anthony Boyd, Jr. (born May 26, 1986) is a former American football linebacker. He played college football at Oregon.

Childhood
Boyd attended E.O.Green Junior High School (Oxnard, Ca) and then attended Hueneme High School (Oxnard, Ca) before transferring to Dorsey Hign School ( Los Angeles, Ca).

Professional career

Oakland Raiders
Boyd was signed by the Oakland Raiders as an undrafted free agent following the 2009 NFL Draft on April 29. He was waived on September 5 and re-signed to the practice squad on September 6. He was promoted to the active roster on December 30. He was waived on September 4, 2010. He was re-signed on March 2, 2011.  He was released in October 2011 by the Oakland Raiders to make room for Chinedum Ndukwe.  He was promoted to the active roster again on November 10, 2011 after the Raiders waived Chinedum Ndukwe.

Toronto Argonauts
On October 16, 2012, Boyd was signed by the Toronto Argonauts of the Canadian Football League. He was released by the Argonauts on November 10, 2012

External links
 Oregon Ducks football bio

1986 births
Living people
Players of American football from Los Angeles
American football safeties
Oregon Ducks football players
Oakland Raiders players
Susan Miller Dorsey High School alumni